For the Lady is a benefit CD set dedicated to freeing Aung San Suu Kyi, the then-imprisoned Burmese opposition leader, and the people of Burma, released by Rhino Records on October 26, 2004. Sale proceeds of the double CD set go to the U.S. Campaign for Burma, a 501(c)(3) benefit campaign.

This benefit CD eventually became banned by the Myanmar military junta.

Track listing 

Disc 1:
 U2 - "Walk On"
 Pearl Jam - "Better Man" (live)
 Coldplay - "In My Place"
 Ani DiFranco - "In the Way"
 Bright Eyes - "No Lies, Just Love"
 R.E.M. - "Drive" (live)
 Avril Lavigne - "Complicated"
 Talib Kweli featuring John Legend - "Around My Way"
 Lili Haydn - "Unfolding Grace"
 Peter Gabriel - "Here Comes the Flood"
 Natalie Merchant - "Motherland"
 Maná - "Cuando Los Angeles Lloran"
 Rebecca Fanya - "Paper Airplanes"
 Ben Harper - "Oppression" (live)

Disc 2:
 Paul McCartney - "Freedom" (live)
 The Nightwatchman - "Let Freedom Ring"
 Eric Clapton - "Wonderful Tonight"
 Sting - "Fragilidad"
 Bonnie Raitt - "Angel From Montgomery" (live)
 Damien Rice - "Lonely Soldier" (live)
 Travis - "The Cage"
 Guster - "Keep It Together"
 Hour Cast - "Memories and Lies"
 Indigo Girls - "Perfect World" (live)
 Better Than Ezra - "Get You In" (live)
 Matchbox Twenty - "So Sad, So Lonely"
 Mun Awng - "Tempest of Blood"

External links
Discogs entry

2004 compilation albums
Charity albums